William Bloke is the seventh album by alternative folk artist Billy Bragg, released in 1996, five years after his last studio album.
The lyrics to "A Pict Song" are by English poet Rudyard Kipling.
The lyrics to "Goalhanger" use the first verse of "The Little Man Who Wasn't There".

Track listing
All tracks composed by Billy Bragg; except where indicated
"From Red to Blue" – 3:21
"Upfield" – 4:07
"Everybody Loves You Babe" – 3:10
"Sugar Daddy" – 4:37
"A Pict Song" (words: Rudyard Kipling) – 4:56
"Brickbat" – 3:14
"The Space Race Is Over" – 4:26
"Northern Industrial Town" – 2:58
"The Fourteenth of February" – 3:27
"King James Version" – 3:21
"Goalhanger" – 3:47

The LP version also includes a final track, "Qualifications".
 Bonus disc
The 2006 Reissue includes a second CD, with the following track listing:

"As Long As You Hold Me" [demo] – 3:26
"Who's Gonna Shoe Your Pretty Little Feet" [demo] – 1:42
"Sugardaddy" [demo] – 4:07
"Space Race Is Over" [demo] – 5:10
"Goalhanger" [demo] – 2:43
"Upfield" [demo] – 5:03
"Fourteenth of February" [demo] – 3:26
"Qualifications" – 1:48
"Never Had No One Ever" – 3:40
"Thatcherites" – 4:13
"All Fall Down" – 3:34

Personnel
Billy Bragg - guitar, vocals
Terry Disley - Hammond B3 organ (1), strings (9), string arrangement
Fionn O'Lochlainn - bass (2,4)
J.F.T. Hood - drums, percussion (2,4,7,9,11)
Cara Tivey - organ, piano (2,3,4,7,9,11)
Terry Edwards - saxophone (2,11)
Caroline Hall - trombone (2,11)
Dave Woodhead - trumpet (2,11), flugelhorn (4), strings (6), brass arrangement
Deirdre Cooper - cello (6,9)
Chris Morgan - double bass (7,10)
Chucho Merchan - double bass (9)
Ashley Dreea - mandolin (10)
Nigel Frydman - bass (11)
Technical
Andy Peak - engineer
Jeff Kleinsmith - artwork
Paul Slattery - photography

Notes 

Billy Bragg albums
1996 albums
Albums produced by Grant Showbiz
Cooking Vinyl albums